Lizzie is a feminine given name. 

Lizzie or Lizzy may also refer to:
 Lake Lizzie, a lake in Minnesota, United States
 Lizzie (1957 film), a film starring Eleanor Parker
 Lizzie (2018 film), a film starring Chloë Sevigny and Kristen Stewart
 Lizzy Grant, a stage name, along with Lana Del Rey, of Elizabeth Woolridge Grant (born 1985), American singer, songwriter, record producer, poet, model and music video director
 Lizzy (singer), South Korean singer and actress Park Soo-ah (born 1992)

See also 
 Big Lizzie, a large tractor
 Thin Lizzy, an Irish rock band
 Tin Lizzy, a nickname for the Ford Model T automobile